Lucinda Foote is best known for attempting to study at Yale College (now University) in 1783, some 186 years prior to women being admitted. Her name was later used by protesters supporting the admission of women to the University in 1963.

Biography
In 1783, female student Lucinda Foote undertook the entrance exams for Yale College (now University), at the age of 12 years old. Based on the results of the exams, in both Latin and Greek, she met the required standard to study at the university. However, she was rejected on the basis of her gender by the President of the University, Ezra Stiles.

Stiles wrote of Foote's application, "Let it be known unto you, that I have tested Miss Lucinda Foote, aged 12, by way of examination, proving that she has made laudable progress in the languages of the learned, viz, the Latin and the Greek; to such an extent that I found her translating and expouding with perfick (sic) ease, both words and sentences in the whole of Vergil's Aeneid, in selected orations of Cicero, and in the Greek testament. I testify that were it not for her sex, she would be considered fit to be admitted as a student of Yale."

Legacy
When the subject of the admission of women to Yale University was raised in 1963, the student demonstrators referred to themselves as the Lucinda Foote Committee. When the prospect of naming two new colleges within the University arose in 2014, history professor Jay Gitlin suggested naming them after Foote or Grace Hopper.

References

American women academics
Yale University people
United States gender discrimination case law
1770s births
Year of death unknown
History of women in Connecticut
18th-century American women
People from Connecticut